Skia is a humanist sans-serif typeface designed by Matthew Carter for Apple Computer in 1994. Skia is Greek for "shadow", and the letterforms take inspiration from stone-carved 1st century BC Greek writing. The typeface was the first QuickDraw GX font, and has been pre-installed in Mac operating systems since System 7.5 (1994), and is in the current Mac OS.

Skia includes "GX variations" technology that – if an application offers the UI – allows its weight to be adjusted smoothly between thin and bold, and its width between narrow and extended. (Adobe's "multiple master" technology was similar.) In 2016 it was announced that several technology companies, including Google, Microsoft and Adobe are adopting Apple's GX variations as the basis of the variations specification inside OpenType 1.8, and since that announcement Skia has been much used to demonstrate the capabilities of the technology.

References

External links 

 Skia at myfonts.com 
 TrueType GX Variations — Skia by Matthew Carter (a video showing the variations axes being adjusted)

Humanist sans-serif typefaces
Incised typefaces
Apple Inc. typefaces
Typefaces and fonts introduced in 1994
Typefaces designed by Matthew Carter